Gianni Ferrio (16 November 1924 – 21 October 2013) was an Italian composer, conductor and music arranger.

Life and career 
Born in Vicenza, Ferrio studied at the conservatories of Vicenza and Venice. Starting in the late 1950s, he was active as a composer of film scores. He composed some 120 soundtracks, mostly for Spaghetti Westerns and commedie sexy all'italiana films. His piece "One Silver Dollar", the main theme to Giorgio Ferroni's Blood for a Silver Dollar (1965), was later included in the soundtrack of Quentin Tarantino's Inglourious Basterds.
Ferrio is also well known for his work in pop music, particularly for his collaboration with Mina, for whom he composed hit songs such as "Parole parole"  and wrote arrangements and orchestrations for many songs and albums. The last collaboration with Mina was on her 2012 album 12 (American Song Book), for which Ferrio provided the string arrangements. 
 
Ferrio served as conductor for the Sanremo Music Festival in 1959 and 1962, for the Eurovision Song Contest 1965, and for several Italian TV shows.

Ferrio was married to ballerina and film actress Alba Arnova.

Selected filmography 

 Who Hesitates Is Lost (1960)
 Toto, Fabrizi and the Young People Today (1960)
 Gentlemen Are Born (1960)
Hercules in the Valley of Woe (1961)
5 marines per 100 ragazze (1961)
The Two Colonels (1962)
Obiettivo ragazze (1963)
The Four Musketeers  (1963)
Heroes of the West (1963)
Blood for a Silver Dollar (1965)
Johnny Golden Poker (1966)
Per Pochi Dollari Ancora (1966)
The Tough One (1966)
Danger!! Death Ray (1967)
The Sweet Sins of Sexy Susan (1967)
Wanted (1967)
The Dirty Outlaws (1967)
Death Sentence (1968)
Find a Place to Die (1968)
Sexy Susan Sins Again (1968)
Why Did I Ever Say Yes Twice? (1969)
Sundance and the Kid (1969)
 House of Pleasure (1969)
A Man for Emmanuelle (1969)
A Bullet for Sandoval (1969)
A Man Called Sledge (1970)
Rendezvous with Dishonour (1970)
Death Occurred Last Night (1970)
Reverend's Colt (1970)
The Bloodstained Butterfly (1971)
Long Live Your Death (1971)
The Scalawag Bunch (1971)
Alta tensión (1972)
Fasthand (1972)
Death Walks at Midnight (1972)
Tony Arzenta (1973)
La isla misteriosa y el capitán Nemo (1973)
The Gamecock (1974)
Puzzle (1974)
Policewoman (1974)
The Boss and the Worker (1975)
Classe mista (1976)
Per amore di Poppea (1977)
La compagna di banco (1977)
California (1977)
The Schoolteacher Goes to Boys' High (1978)
Blazing Flowers (1978)
La liceale nella classe dei ripetenti (1978)
How to Lose a Wife and Find a Lover (1978)
Swept Away by Family Affection (1978)
How to Seduce Your Teacher (1979)
The Nurse in the Military Madhouse (1979)
La ripetente fa l'occhietto al preside (1980)
I Don't Understand You Anymore (1980)
I'm Getting a Yacht (1980)
La settimana bianca (1980)
L'onorevole con l'amante sotto il letto (1981)
Delitto passionale (1994)
Look Who's Back (2015)

References

External links 
  
 
 Gianni Ferrio at Discogs

1924 births
2013 deaths
Italian music arrangers
Italian male conductors (music)
Italian male composers
Italian pop musicians
20th-century Italian composers
Italian film score composers
Italian male film score composers
Eurovision Song Contest conductors
People from Vicenza
20th-century Italian conductors (music)
20th-century Italian male musicians